Lahu Ke Do Rang is a 1979 Hindi movie directed by Mahesh Bhatt. The film stars Vinod Khanna, Shabana Azmi, Danny Denzongpa, Helen, Ranjeet. The music and lyrics for the film are by Bappi Lahiri and Farooq Qaiser respectively.

The story, screenplay and dialogues of the film are written by Suraj Sanim. The film was shot in Hong Kong and India. The film was rated a "hit" at the box office.

Plot
Shamsher Singh (played by Vinod Khanna) is part of the Indian army led by Subhas Chandra Bose to fight the British out of India. With the British on his back to catch him in Hong Kong, he is rescued and helped by Suzy (played by Helen). Falling in love with him, Suzy becomes pregnant with Shamsher's baby. But she lets Shamsher go back to India as he is on a greater mission, asking him to return to take her and their baby along with him to India. Back in India, Shamsher is already married to Ladjo (played by Indrani Mukherjee). The two of them have a son named Raj.

Shamsher's friend Shankar (played by Ranjeet) betrays them all with help of Mac (played by Mac Mohan) and kills Shamsher. But Mac also betrays Shankar and hides the looted gold somewhere without telling it to Shankar.

Years later Shamsher's son Raj Singh (also played by Vinod Khanna) joins the police force and becomes an Inspector. He is now interested in finding the murderers of his father. Mac, who finishes his jail time, is released and is hunted by Shankar for the looted gold. Shankar has now changed his name into Devi Dayal. Mac reveals to Devi Dayal that the gold is buried in a car that is at the bottom of a deep lake. To fetch the gold, they hire an excellent diver Suraj (played by Danny Denzongpa). Suraj is the illegitimate son of Shamsher and Suzy and is angry about how his mother Suzy was betrayed by Shamsher and how he never returned to get them.

On his quest to solve a murder case, Raj goes to Darjeeling where he meets Roma (played by Shabana Azmi) and falls in love with her. Suraj is also in Darjeeling on his new job called in by Devi Dayal. Suraj too falls in love with Roma, but is very hesitant to communicate. Roma tells Raj of how her mother had been hooked to drugs by Devi Dayal. A series of incidents reveal all the secrets and Raj and Suraj unite to take revenge for their father's death. Suraj saves her.

Cast

Vinod Khanna as Shamsher Singh / Inspector Raj Singh / Gopi Kathuria (Double Role) 
Shabana Azmi as Roma
Danny Denzongpa as Suraj Singh
Ranjeet as Shankar Kathuria / Devidayal
Helen as Suzy
Indrani Mukherjee as Laajo Singh
Goga Kapoor as Goga
Mac Mohan as Mac
Prema Narayan as Meena / Anita
Mohan Sherry as Mohan
Raj Kumar Kapoor as Dr. Banerjee
Shammi as Roma's Mother

Music
Composed by Bappi Lahiri, the songs are penned by Faruk Kaiser.

Awards
27th Filmfare Awards:

Won

 Best Supporting Actress – Helen
 Best Art Direction – Madhukar Shinde

References

External links 
 

1979 films
1970s Hindi-language films
Films scored by Bappi Lahiri
Films directed by Mahesh Bhatt
Films shot in Hong Kong